The ochrophytes, subphylum Ochrophytina, is a group of mostly photosynthetic heterokonts. Their plastid is of red algal origin. 

The classification of the group is still being worked out. Originally, the ochrophytes were regarded as a phylum denominated Ochrophyta. Some authors (e.g., Cavalier-Smith) divided it into two subphyla, Phaeista Cavalier-Smith 1995 (comprising Hypogyristea and Chrysista in some classifications, or Limnista and Marista in others) and Khakista Cavalier-Smith, 2000 (comprising Bolidomonas and diatoms). Others prefer not to use the subphyla, listing only lower taxa (e.g., Reviers, 2002, Guiry & Guiry, 2014).

However, it is currently regarded as a subphylum inside of the phylum Gyrista, along with Pseudofungi and Bigyromonada. It contains two infraphyla: Diatomista, containing diatoms and related groups, and Chrysista, containing brown and golden algae and related groups.

Phylogeny 
The cladogram below shows the evolutionary relationships between all ochrophyte classes. It is based on the latest phylogenetic analyses:

Classification
Below is the present classification of ochrophytes, with the inclusion of three new classes of algae described in 2019, 2020 and 2021.
Infraphylum Chrysista 
Superclass Limnistia 
Class Eustigmatophyceae 
Class Chrysomonadea  [=Chrysophyceae ] 
Class Picophagea  [=Synchromophyceae ]
Superclass Raphidoistia 
Class Raphidomonadea 
Subclass Raphidophycidae 
Subclass Raphopoda 
Superclass Fucistia 
Class Aurophyceae 
Subclass Aurearenophycidae 
Subclass Phaeothamniophycidae 
Class Chrysomerophyceae 
Class Chrysoparadoxophyceae 
Class Phaeosacciophyceae 
Class Schizocladiophyceae 
Class Phaeophyceae  [=Fucophyceae ; Melanophyceae ] (“brown algae”)
Subclass Discosporangiophycidae
Subclass Ishigeophycidae 
Subclass Dictyotophycidae 
Subclass Fucophycidae 
Class Xanthophyceae  [=Tribophyceae ; Heterokontae ] (“yellow-green algae”)
Infraphylum Diatomista 
Superclass Hypogyrista 
Class Dictyochophyceae  [=Dictyochia ; Alophycidae ]
Subclass Pedinellia  [=Actinochrysophyceae ] (“axodines”)
Subclass Pelagophycidae  [=Pelagophyceae ]
?Subclass Sulcophycidae 
Class Pinguiophyceae 
Superclass Khakista 
Class Bolidophyceae 
Class Diatomeae  [=Bacillariae ; Bacillariophyceae ]
Subclass Corethrophycidae 
Subclass Rhizosoleniophycidae 
Subclass Eucentricophycidae 
Subclass Bacillariophycidae [=Pennatia ; =Pennatophycidae]
Ochrophytina incertae sedis
Class Olisthodiscophyceae

Notes

References

 
SAR supergroup phyla